Pseudataenius is a genus of aphodiine dung beetles in the family Scarabaeidae. There are at least three described species in Pseudataenius.

Species
These three species belong to the genus Pseudataenius:
 Pseudataenius contortus Cartwright, 1974
 Pseudataenius gracilitarsis (Petrovitz, 1973)
 Pseudataenius socialis (Horn, 1871)

References

Further reading

 
 
 

Scarabaeidae
Articles created by Qbugbot